Sidikalang is a town in North Sumatra province of Indonesia and it is the seat (capital) of Dairi Regency.

 Climate

Notable people 

 Bonar Sianturi (1944–2022), former Regent of Sintang (1989–1994)

References

Populated places in North Sumatra
Regency seats of North Sumatra